Foghat are an English rock band formed in London in 1971. The band is known for the use of electric slide guitar in its music. The band has achieved eight gold records, one platinum and one double platinum record, and despite several line-up changes, continue to record and perform.

History

1970s
The band initially featured Dave Peverett ("Lonesome Dave") on guitar and vocals, Tony Stevens on bass and Roger Earl on drums, after all three musicians left Savoy Brown in 1971. Rod Price, on guitar/slide guitar, joined after he left Black Cat Bones in December 1970. The new line-up was named "Foghat" (a nonsense word from a Scrabble-like game played by Peverett and his brother) in January 1971. There is a cartoon drawing on the back cover of the group's first album of a head wearing a foghat.

Foghat relocated to the United States after signing a deal with Bearsville Records. Its debut album, Foghat (1972), was produced by Dave Edmunds and featured a cover of Willie Dixon's "I Just Want to Make Love to You", which received considerable airplay, especially on FM stations. The album also included a remake of Savoy Brown's bluesy ode to the road "Leavin' Again (Again!)", and "Sarah Lee", a classic blues burner featuring Price's slide guitar solo. The band's second self-titled album went gold. It was also known as Rock and Roll for its cover photo of a rock and a bread roll. Energized (1974) came out, followed by Rock and Roll Outlaws (1974) and Fool for the City (1975). In 1974, Stevens left the band due to its relentless touring schedule and was temporarily replaced by producer Nick Jameson for the recording of Fool for the City. During the next year, Jameson was replaced by Craig MacGregor, and the group released Night Shift (1976), a live album (1977) and Stone Blue (1978), each attaining gold status in record sales. Fool for the City spawned the hit single "Slow Ride" (which reached No. 20 in the United States and No. 14 in Canada), but the greatest sales figures were reached by Foghat Live, which went double platinum. More hits followed: "Drivin' Wheel", "I Just Want to Make Love to You" (from the live album), "Stone Blue" and "Third Time Lucky (First Time I Was a Fool)". Price left the band in November 1980, unhappy with the group's still constant touring and the shift away from the hard boogie sound toward a more new wave-influenced pop direction. By February 1981, after months of auditions, he was replaced by Erik Cartwright.

1980s
After 1978, Foghat's record sales began to slip, and its last album for the Bearsville label, Zig-Zag Walk (1983), only briefly touched the charts at number 192. MacGregor quit in 1982, and Jameson returned to play on In the Mood for Something Rude and Zig Zag Walk before being replaced by Kenny Aaronson (1983) and then Rob Alter (1983-1984). MacGregor returned in 1984.

The band briefly disbanded in 1984 after Peverett left and returned to England. Earl, along with MacGregor and Cartwright, reformed with a new singer/guitarist, Eric (E.J.) Burgeson, and continued touring as Foghat into the early 1990s. MacGregor (1986-1987, 1991), Cartwright's brother Brett Cartwright (1987, 1988–1989) and Jeff Howell (1987-1988, 1989–1991) alternated on bass during that period, while Phil Nudelman (1989-1990) and Billy Davis (1990-1993) took over for Burgeson. Dave Crigger joined on bass in 1991–1993.

1990s
Peverett had returned to the United States by 1990 and formed his own version of the band, Lonesome Dave's Foghat, which featured Bryan Bassett (ex-Wild Cherry), Stephen Dees (bass) and Eddie Zyne (drums). Dees and Zyne had played with Hall & Oates, among others. Former Molly Hatchet bassist Riff West replaced Dees in 1991, and Price made several guest appearances.

In 1993, the original line-up reunited at the urging of producer Rick Rubin. Although Rubin ultimately proved to be unavailable to produce their comeback project, the group went ahead and released a studio album titled Return of the Boogie Men (1994) and the Road Cases live album (1998). Its final album of the decade, King Biscuit Flower Hour (taken from the syndicated radio show of the same name), was released in May 1999 and consisted of live recordings from 1974 and 1976.

After being back together for six years, the original line-up once again ended after Price decided to retire from touring for good. Bassett (who had been playing with Molly Hatchet), from Lonesome Dave's Foghat, was brought in on guitar.

2000s

The 2000s saw the deaths of founding members Peverett and Price. Peverett died on 7 February 2000, aged 56, from complications from kidney cancer.

Charlie Huhn (formerly of Humble Pie, Ted Nugent, and Victory) was brought in to replace him on lead vocals and guitar. This line-up of Earl, Stevens, Bassett, Huhn and Steve "ih" Farrell on backing vocals and hand percussion recorded the album Family Joules (2003).

Price died on 22 March 2005, aged 57, due to a fall resulting from a heart attack. Later that year, original bassist Stevens left the band and was replaced by former bassist MacGregor.

2010s

The 2010 version of Foghat consisted of Earl, MacGregor, Huhn and Bassett. Former Rainbow and Black Sabbath drummer Bobby Rondinelli had temporarily replaced Earl for a summer 2010 concert, while Earl was recovering from surgery. At another Foghat concert that summer, after Earl had returned to the band, bassist Jeff Howell temporarily replaced an ill MacGregor. Foghat's next album, Last Train Home (released 15 June 2010), was the culmination of a dream shared by Earl and Peverett. It contained some of their favorite blues songs, three originals ("Born for the Road", "Last Train Home" and "495 Boogie"), and two songs by special guest performer and longtime friend Eddie Kirkland, who was 86 years old at the time. He had played with Foghat as a guest in 1977 at Foghat's "Tribute to the Blues" show at New York City's Palladium, and remained a good friend of the band until he was killed in a car accident on 27 February 2011.

Also performing on Last Train Home were Howell (bass), Colin Earl (piano) and Lefty Lefkowitz (harmonica). According to Earl, the album was "a testimony to Lonesome Dave. We always planned to do this. I am so fortunate to have partners in band members Charlie Huhn and Bryan Bassett who share the same passion for the blues. It was not hard work putting this album together; playing this kind of music is joyous. We had a blast!"

The band released a DVD in December 2013 called Live in St. Pete.

On 10 November 2015, Foghat announced that they would start work on a new studio album, completely fan-funded through PledgeMusic. The album, titled Under the Influence, was released on 24 June 2016. The album went on to chart of Billboard and debuted at No. 17 on Billboard's Hard Rock Albums, and peaked at No. 40 on the Independent Album charts.

The band went on to release another live album, Live at the Belly Up in June 2017. On 9 July 2017, Erik Cartwright, who played lead guitar from 1981 to 1984, died at his home in Nashville, Tennessee, from a heart attack. He was 66 years old.

Longtime bassist MacGregor was diagnosed with stage IV lung cancer in 2015. The cancer was first detected at an earlier stage in 2012, but MacGregor was not informed until 2015. Following this incident, he became a proponent of a bill that would require physicians to communicate test results with patients promptly. Although still officially a member of Foghat, the effects of chemotherapy made him unable to play music. former Pat Travers bassist Rodney O'Quinn filled in for him on tours. MacGregor died on 9 February 2018.

Matt Barranti substituted on guitar for Bryan Bassett for a gig at Palace Theater in Greensburg, Pennsylvania on 11 February 2017.

2020s

The lineup of Earl, Bassett, Huhn and O'Quinn would go on to record a live record in November 2019 called 8 Days on the Road. The album was released in July 2021.

In January 2022, lead singer Charlie Huhn retired. Scott Holt, formerly a guitarist for Buddy Guy, became the new lead singer and guitarist. Holt had previously lent his vocals for Under the Influence and was lead vocalist in Foghat side project Earl & the Agitators.

Members

Current
 Roger Earl – drums 
 Bryan Bassett – lead guitar, backing vocals 
 Rodney O'Quinn – bass guitar, backing vocals 
 Scott Holt – lead vocals, rhythm guitar 

Former
 Dave Peverett – lead vocals, rhythm guitar 
 Rod Price – lead guitar, slide guitar, backing vocals 
 Tony Stevens – bass guitar, backing vocals 
 Nick Jameson – bass guitar, keyboards, backing vocals 
 Craig MacGregor – bass guitar, backing vocals 
 Erik Cartwright – lead guitar, backing vocals 
 Kenny Aaronson – bass guitar 
 Rob Alter – bass guitar 
 Charlie Huhn – lead vocals, rhythm guitar

Discography

Studio albums

Live albums

Compilations
 Best of Foghat (1985) US: Gold
 Best of Foghat Volume 2 (1992)
 Best of Foghat (Rhino Special Edition) (1992)
 Slow Ride and Other Hits (1997)
 Anthology (1999)
 Hits You Remember Live (2001)
 Live 2000 (2001)
 The Essentials (2002)
 The Definitive Rock Collection Double CD (2006)

Singles

References

External links
 Official website of current Foghat
 2007 Roger Earl interview

1971 establishments in England
1984 disestablishments in England
1993 establishments in England
Atlantic Records artists
Musical quartets
Musical groups from London
English blues rock musical groups
English hard rock musical groups
Grammy Award winners
Musical groups established in 1971
Musical groups disestablished in 1984
Musical groups reestablished in 1993
Bearsville Records artists
Rhino Records artists